Psychotria deverdiana is a species of plant in the family Rubiaceae. It is endemic to New Caledonia.

References

Endemic flora of New Caledonia
deverdiana
Endangered plants
Taxonomy articles created by Polbot